The Ibanez K7 series is a signature series of seven-string guitars created by Korn guitarists James "Munky" Shaffer and Brian "Head" Welch.

Specifications
The K7 guitars were originally available in two finishes, Firespeak Blue (James "Munky" Shaffer's  model), and Blade Gray (Brian "Head" Welch's model).  They came factory tuned to KoRn signature tuning: A, D, G, C, F, A, D (low to high), and were retailed at USD 1,799. These guitars are characterized by the deep metallic sound, from the body being made of mahogany that is well suited for Korn's musical style. The last year of production on these particular models was 2006.

In 2007 Ibanez released new versions of Korn's signature series as the Apex. There are two models linked to Munky only, however K7s can still be seen played by Munky in live performances.

Although 7-string guitars were not used for recording his debut album Save Me from Myself, Welch had continued to use his original K7s as his exclusive signature guitar, even during his almost eight-year absence from Korn.

References

External links
 http://www.ibanez.com/
 http://www.korn.com/
 http://www.brianheadwelch.net/
 http://www.sevenstring.org

K7